Ace of Diamond is an anime series based on the manga by Yuji Terajima serialized in Weekly Shōnen Magazine. An anime adaptation of Ace of Diamond Act II has been announced, and it premiered on April 2, 2019. The series is listed for 52 episodes.

Six pieces of theme music are used for the episodes: two opening and four ending themes. From episodes 127–155, the opening theme is "Hajimari no Uta (はじまりのうた)" by GLAY while the ending themes are "Golden After School (ゴールデンアフタースクール)" by OxT and "Kodō Escalation (鼓動エスカレーション)" by Maaya Uchida. From episode 156 onwards, the second opening theme is "Ryūsei no Howl (流星のHOWL)" by GLAY while the ending themes are "Chance! (チャンス！)" by Suzuko Mimori and "Everlasting Dream" by OxT.


Episodes

References

 Ace of Diamond episode lists
2019 Japanese television seasons
2020 Japanese television seasons